Gladys Turner Nisbet (Grafton, Illinois, 11 September 1895 – Highlands Ranch, Colorado, 7 October 1994) was an American botanist known for researching the genus Penstemon, particularly in New Mexico.  Nisbet earned a Masters in Biology at the University of New Mexico expanding on work she had done as an undergraduate at New Mexico Normal University. A species of fossil coral which she discovered in Arizona, Iowaphyllum nisbeti, is named in her honor.

References

1895 births
1994 deaths
American women scientists
American women botanists
Penstemon
20th-century American women
20th-century American people